Paralpenus strigulosa is a moth of the family Erebidae. It was described by George Hampson in 1901. It is found in South Africa.

The larvae feed on Cyanotis nodifera and Vernonia gerradi.

References

Endemic moths of South Africa
Spilosomina
Moths described in 1901